Turnul Colţei (also Turnul Colțea or Colții) was a tower located in Bucharest, Wallachia, now in Romania. Its initial purpose was to be used as a bell tower — its  bell, was moved to the Sinaia Monastery after the tower was demolished. It was also meant to serve as a watch tower.

The tower was named after Vornic Colțea Doicescu. His brother, Udrea Doicesu, built a small wooden church on the plot near the tower; after he was assassinated, the church and the land next to it were inherited by Colțea, who donated them to the Orthodox Metropolis of Ungro-Wallachia.

The tower was built between 1709 and 1714, its construction being assisted by the Swedish soldiers of the army of King Charles XII, who had fled to Wallachia after the disastrous defeat at the Battle of Poltava. Mihai Cantacuzino kept his secret archive inside the tower.

An earthquake on October 14, 1802 of magnitude 7.7 to 7.9 destroyed the top part of the tower, including its clock; in 1888, it was demolished completely. Two years later, in 1890, another structure was built as a watch tower, Foișorul de Foc.

Gallery

See also
Colţea Monastery

Notes

References
Ştefan Ionescu, Bucureștii în vremea fanarioţilor ("Bucharest in the Time of the Phanariotes"), Editura Dacia, Cluj, 1974.

Towers completed in 1714
Christian bell towers
Demolished buildings and structures in Bucharest
History of Bucharest
Towers in Romania
1714 establishments in the Ottoman Empire
Buildings and structures demolished in 1888